Village St. George is a census-designated place (CDP) in East Baton Rouge Parish, Louisiana, United States. The population was 7,104 at the 2010 census. It is part of the Baton Rouge Metropolitan Statistical Area.

It is in the proposed City of St. George.

Geography
Village St. George is located in southern East Baton Rouge Parish at  (30.362642, -91.068049). It is bordered to the west, across Siegen Lane, by Oak Hills Place.

Demographics

As of the 2020 United States census, there were 7,677 people, 2,635 households, and 1,886 families residing in the CDP.

As of the census of 2000, there were 6,993 people, 2,570 households, and 1,888 families residing in the CDP. The racial makeup of the CDP was 71.37% White, 23.68% African American, 0.19% Native American, 2.62% Asian, 0.01% Pacific Islander, 0.53% from other races, and 1.60% from two or more races. Hispanic or Latino of any race were 3.32% of the population.

There were 2,570 households, out of which 42.1% had children under the age of 18 living with them, 56.1% were married couples living together, 13.9% had a female householder with no husband present, and 26.5% were non-families. 20.9% of all households were made up of individuals, and 3.6% had someone living alone who was 65 years of age or older. The average household size was 2.72 and the average family size was 3.20.

In the CDP, the population was spread out, with 29.8% under the age of 18, 9.4% from 18 to 24, 34.0% from 25 to 44, 22.2% from 45 to 64, and 4.6% who were 65 years of age or older. The median age was 32 years. For every 100 females, there were 91.5 males. For every 100 females age 18 and over, there were 86.3 males.

The median income for a household in the CDP was $55,646, and the median income for a family was $64,255. Males had a median income of $48,333 versus $30,189 for females. The per capita income for the CDP was $25,742. About 5.3% of families and 6.7% of the population were below the poverty line, including 8.7% of those under age 18 and 14.8% of those age 65 or over.

Education
East Baton Rouge Parish Public Schools serves Village St. George.

Most of the community is served by Wildwood Elementary School. Some parts of northern Village St. George are zoned to Jefferson Terrace Elementary in Inniswold, and a small portion to the northwest is zoned to Westminster Elementary School in Westminster. Most of the area is served by Kenilworth Middle School, while Woodlawn Middle School serves a section in the north.  Kenilworth is under the administration of the Recovery School District of Louisiana, and the portion of the Kenilworth zone which houses most of the CDP has Woodlawn Middle School, directly controlled by EBR Schools, as an option. Residents are served by Woodlawn High School in Old Jefferson.

References

Census-designated places in Louisiana
Census-designated places in East Baton Rouge Parish, Louisiana
Baton Rouge metropolitan area